Ministry of Land Defence was in a broad sense, one of the eight ministries, in which the Swedish government administration was divided into. Its head was called Minister of War. The Ministry of Land Defence Department was established on 16 May 1840 and was merged with the Ministry for Naval Affairs into the newly established Ministry of Defence on 30 June 1920.

History
The Ministry of Land Defence was established in connection with the ministry reform in 1840. The cases, previously handled by the War Office (Krigsexpeditionen), were now divided between the Ministry of Land Defence and the Ministry for Naval Affairs. The Ministry of Land Defence's first cabinet meeting day was on 19 May 1840. According to the Royal Decree concerning the distribution of cases between the ministries on 16 May 1840 (SFS 1840 No. 14), the following cases sorted under the Ministry of Land Defence:

Cases relating to the organization and maintenance of the land defence, as well as the staff, the disposition of funds and equipment to the land defence, the construction and maintenance of fortifications, educational institutions, church and medical affairs, pension and charity facilities for the land army and associated staff; the Allotment system and Roteringsverket for the army; questions about commanding land troops for service or use for the necessary public works; the care of homes and buildings of the land defence, and The Crown's additional insight into the use of artillery foundry (styckebruk), the rifle factories and the gunpowder manufacturing; questions concerning telegraph arrangements (the telegraphic arrangements here means the military optical telegraph) in Sweden, with the exception of the individual needs of the Swedish Navy. In addition came the so-called command matters (kommandomålen), i.e. those matters of generally less importance which were determined by the king as Supreme Commander of Sweden's military force.

These cases were settled, in accordance with §15 of the Instrument of Government for the Ministry of Land Defence's concern, by the King, following presentation by the head of the Ministry of Land Defence, and in attendance only by him. The command matters mainly concerned the Swedish Army's weapons exercises, schools, training courses, personnel accounts, service conditions, regulations, etc. During the period up to the issue of the renewed ministry statute in 1900, the ministry was liberated from some of the often complex cases relating to the gradual modifications of the allotment system. Following the decommissioning of the allotment system by the new army order in 1901, only the cases relating to its decommissioning remained. Until the Ministry of Land Defence's merging into the Ministry of Defence in 1920, some significant changes in the ministry's area of affairs did not take place. In 1920, the ministry's all cases were transferred to the new ministry. For preparing these cases, the head of the ministry had a department of the Royal Majesty's Chancery (Kunglig Majestäts kansli), which consisted of one permanent undersecretary, two deputy directors (kansliråd) and directors (byråchef), three office secretaries, one registrar and an unspecified number of extra officials (assistants).

Under the Ministry of Land Defence sorted government agencies such as: the Military Office of the Ministry of Land Defence and the Royal Swedish Army Materiel Administration. The ministry also belonged to the army with its Generalitet, the General Staff, the regiments and the corps, the Commendant Staff (Kommendantskapen), the Royal Swedish Army Staff College, the Artillery and Engineering College, the Royal Military Academy, the Royal Swedish Academy of War Sciences and other military education and training institutions, the subordinate ordnance, ammunition and rifle stores of the Royal Swedish Army Materiel Administration, the investigative offices in Stockholm and at Karlsborg, the Fortification Commissariat (Fästningsintendenturen) in Stockholm, the State Warehouse Agency (Magasinsstaten) in Stockholm with the Crown Bakery (Kronobageriet), the Carl Gustafs Stads Gevärsfaktori, Marieberg's Ammunition Factory, Fortification Treasurers and custodians, the Potassium Nitrate Maker's School (Salpetersjuderiskolan), the Discipline Company at Karlsborg, the garrison hospitals in Stockholm and at Karlsborg, as well as all the foundations of the land defence.

As a result of the act on the state ministries on 19 June 1919, the Ministry of Land Defence and the  Ministry for Naval Affairs were merged into a new ministry, the Ministry of Defence, from 1 July 1920.

Location
During the years 1840-1851, the Ministry of Land Defence was, like the Ministry for Naval Affairs, located in the Stenbockska palatset at Birger Jarls torg 4. During this time, however, the Military Office was located in the so-called Preisiska huset at Drottninggatan 36. In 1851, the ministry moved to Mynthuset (the predecessor of the current Kanslihuset), where it remained until 1920.

Ministers
The head of the ministry had officially the title of "Council of State (Statsråd) and head of the Ministry of Land Defence", but was commonly referred to as the Minister of War.

1840–1840: Bror Cederström
1840–1843: Axel Otto Mörner
1843–1844: Arfved Lovisin
1844–1848: Gustaf Peyron
1848–1853: Carl Ludvig von Hohenhausen
1853–1858: Nils Gyldenstolpe
1858–1862: Magnus Björnstjerna
1862–1867: Alexander Reuterskiöld
1867–1871: Gustaf Abelin
1871–1877: Oscar Weidenhielm
1877–1880: Henrik Rosensvärd
1880–1882: Otto Taube
1882–1887: Axel Ryding
1887–1888: Gustaf Oscar Peyron
1888–1892: Hjalmar Palmstierna
1892–1899: Axel Rappe
1899–1903: Jesper Crusebjörn
1903–1905: Otto Virgin
1905–1907: Lars Tingsten
1907–1907: Arvid Lindman
1907–1911: Olof Malm
1911–1914: David Bergström
1914–1914: Hjalmar Hammarskjöld
1914–1917: Emil Mörcke
1917–1917: Joachim Åkerman
1917–1920: Erik Nilson
1920–1920: Per Albin Hansson

Permanent Undersecretaries

1840–1843: Carl David Forsberg
1843–1844: Carl Wilhelm Riben
1844–1855: Malcolm von Schantz
1855–1866: Carl Gustaf Årman
1866–1873: Nils Adolf Varenius
1873–1881: Alfred Sjöberg
1881–1886: Erik Elliot
1886–1895: Ehrenfried von der Lancken
1895–1898: Carl Edvard Cassel
1898–1899: Emil Sjöberg
1899–1904: Carl Herman Weidenheim
1904–1909: Fredrik Bergenholtz
1909–1916: Oscar Henry Arsell
1916–1917: Carl Malmroth (acting)
1917–1920: Knut Söderwall

State Secretaries
1917–1920: Carl Malmroth

Footnotes

References

Land Defence
Sweden
Sweden, Land Defence
Sweden, Land Defence